The A4241 Port Talbot Peripheral Distributor Road is a distributor road serving Port Talbot, Wales.

Route
The A4241 begins at the Sunnycroft roundabout in Baglan near Baglan railway station traversing Seaway Parade in a south westerly direction, where it serves the Baglan Bay area and the Baglan Energy Park, until the junction with Afan Way.  The route then continues in a south easterly direction along Afan Way, serving the Sandfields housing estate to the southwest and the Baglan Industrial Park and Neath Port Talbot Hospital to the northeast.  The A4241 then, crosses the River Afan and traverses the northern area of Port Talbot docks.  It then continues past the steelworks where it joins the A48 and the M4 motorway at M4 Junction 38.

Port Talbot Peripheral Distributor Road

Premise
The Peripheral Distributor Road was developed to assist in the industrial and commercial development of the south western area of Port Talbot, to free the flow of traffic from the busy section of the M4 motorway between Junctions 38 at Margam and Junction 41 at Baglan and to provide environmental improvements, by way of reduced traffic noise and pollution, to the populated residential areas between these junctions.

The route of the A4241 provides access to land that is available for development and also removes local traffic from the M4 which is approaching full capacity around Port Talbot.  It is also forecast that traffic volumes will rise in the future by 40%. Since the areas beside the elevated section is well developed, it is not feasible to widen the motorway.

Development and construction

The Peripheral Distributor Road scheme is funded by the Welsh Assembly Government Transport Grant, Objective 1 and the Local Regeneration Fund.  The scheme was designed by Neath Port Talbot County Borough Council and tendered under the Engineering and Construction Contract, Option D.  The successful tenderer was the Hochtief Griffiths Joint Venture.

The route is being developed in stages:

References

Transport in Neath Port Talbot
Roads in Wales